is a 1999 Japanese ninja-themed jidaigeki film directed by Masahiro Shinoda. It was co-written by Shinoda and Katsuo Naruse, and stars Kiichi Nakai It is the second adaptation of Ryōtarō Shiba's 1959 novel Fukurō no Shiro, the first being the 1963 film Castle of Owls.

Cast 
 Kiichi Nakai as Jūzō Tsuzura
 Takaya Kamikawa as Gohei Kazama
 Mayu Tsuruta as Kohagi
 Riona Hazuki as Kisaru
 Shōhei Hino as Kuroami
 Akiji Kobayashi
 Akira Nakao
 Mako Iwamatsu as Toyotomi Hideyoshi
 Jinpachi Nezu as Hattori Hanzō
 Kinnosuke Hannayagi as Ishida Mitsunari
 Shima Iwashita
 Masahiko Tsugawa
 Atsuo Nakamura

Production
Nintendo was a production partner on the film, and the use of special effects and computer-generated imagery was widely touted in the film's marketing.

Awards and accolades 
Nikkan Sports Film Awards: Ishihara Yujiro Award (1999).
Puchon International Fantastic Film Festival: Best Director - Masahiro Shinoda (2000).
Japanese Academy Awards: Best Art Direction - Yoshinobu Nishioka (2000). The film also received nine Japanese Academy Award nominations.

References

External links 
 
 
 Comparison between original film (Castle of Owls) and the remake

1999 films
1990s adventure drama films
1999 romantic drama films
1990s Japanese-language films
Jidaigeki films
Ninja films
Toho films
Remakes of Japanese films
Cultural depictions of Hattori Hanzō
Cultural depictions of Toyotomi Hideyoshi
Cultural depictions of Tokugawa Ieyasu
Films based on Japanese novels
1990s Japanese films